The Sturdza Palace at Miclăușeni or Sturdza Castle at Miclăușeni is a historic monument in the village of Miclăușeni, at a distance of  from Roman and  from the city of Iași.  Currently, it is part of the Miclăușeni Historic Monastery complex, designated by the Romanian Ministry of Culture and National Patrimony in 2015.  The historic complex is composed of the following monuments:

 The Church of the Holy Princes and Annunciation (Biserica "Sf. Voievozi", "Buna Vestire") dating from 1787 and having LMI code: IS-II-m-B-04199.01
 The Sturdza Palace, dating from the 17th century, with LMI code: IS-II-M-B-04199.02
 The Miclăușeni Monastery Park, dating from the 18th century and being listed as LMI: IS-II-M-B-04199.03

History

Original Manor
In 1410, Voivode Alexander the Good (Alexandru cel Bun) granted a fief to boyar and member of Sfatul Domnesc ("Prince's Council"), Miclăuș, an estate located near the Siret River plains. After the death of the noble, the estate became known by his namesake, Miclăușeni. On April 25, 1591, the nobleman's descendants sold the estate to treasurer Simon Stroici (1550–1623), who built a mansion on the property and fortified the village of Miclăușeni in 1598. The ruins of the first mansion could still be seen as late as the beginning of the twentieth century.

In his last will and testament dated June 5, 1622, Simon Stroici bequeathed the estate and village of Miclăușeni to Lupu Prăjăscu, stating:

 Lupului Prăjăscului și nepoatei mele Saftei, și fiului meu, la Gligorie, cu heleștee și cu prisăci și cu tot venitul, pentru că i-am luat spre dânșii ca să-mi fie ei ficiori de suflet.
 To Lupul Prăjăscu and my niece, Safta, and my son, Gligorie, with ponds and with land and with all of the income, because I have taken them to be my soul family.

In 1697, the descendants of Lupu Prăjăscu, whom had no survivors, gave the estate to distant relatives, brothers Ion and Sandu Sturdza. On April 19, 1699, the Sturdza brothers divided the estate with Miclăușeni being awarded to Ion Sturdza. Feudal peasants and gypsies worked the land, whose descendants to this day have surnames describing their feudal professions; Bucătaru(Chef), Muraru (Mill worker), Pitaru (Baker), Curelaru (leather cutter), Mindirigiu (mattress maker), Bivolaru (livestock hearder), Surugiu (coachman), as described in the book "Castelul Miclăușeni în cultura română" (Miclăușeni Castle and Romanian Culture), Ed. "Cronica", Iași, 1996.

In 1752, Lord Ioan Sturdza rebuilt the boyar mansion, building it with a semi-basement and cross-shaped ground level. The mansion had 20 rooms, ten of them on each floor. Race horses were housed in the Manor's stable. The floor and ceilings were made of wood beam and wood planks. It is said that the housekeepers had their work cut out for them dealing with the mice and bugs that roamed the residence, with the Master of the Manor giving the following orders:

să se puie în var vreo doftorie de ploșniță și să speli cu aceea și podelele pe sus cu badanaua“, în timp ce „bortele de șoareci să se astupe toate cu cărbuni pisați cu steclă

Upon this place you will rub medicinal powder to kill the bedbugs which are to be embedded in the paint, and to wash the ceilings in said medicine. The holes where mice come and go shall be plugged with crushed coal and grinded glass

Concerned with the expansion of the estate, the son of Ion Strudza, Dimitrie, built a church in the vicinity of the palace in 1821–1823. He adorned the church with baroque-style icons and numerous valuable objects. The son of Dimitrie, Alecu Sturdza Miclăușanu, built a park of  all stylized as an English Garden with ornamental tree species and numerous flower beds. Alecu, as a hobby, dealt in the collection and preservation of rare books and manuscripts, which further added to the richness of the Palace.  Even future Prime Minister Mihail Kogălniceanu spoke of the rare books and manuscripts collected by the estate.

Although cousin to Prince Mihail Strudza (1834–1849), Alecu Strudza embraced the ideas of the Revolutionaries of 1848. He died in 1848 of cholera, under suspicion that he was poisoned by the Prince. His mark upon the estate was a high-degree of maintenance and precision on the English Gardens and Park on the estate grounds.  He was buried in the manor's church, leaving the estate to the widow Catina.  She passed the estate to her son, George A. Strudza in 1863, whom built the Sturdza Palace as seen today

Construction of the Palace

In 1869, George Sturdza married Maria, the daughter of writer Ion Ghica, moving the family into the Manor.  Maria, 11 years younger than George, was unsettled in her new environment and in the Manor.  Eager to remake the Manor building, George Sturdza sold off several forests from the Estate and took out a loan of 100,000 Lei from the Romanian Land Credit Society ("Societatea de Credit Funciar Român"). He placed the Miclăuşeni Estate as collateral, agreeing to pay back the debts in gold coins.

Between 1880 and 1904, George Sturdza built on the site of the old Manor the late Gothic architectural palace that exists today.  He wanted the Palace complex to mimic the feudal castles of the West, also be reminiscent of the Palace of Culture in Iasi, and lastly also of the Lord Alexandru Cuza's palace in Ruginoasa.

The Palace was used as a home for orphans  under Communist rule, counter to the wishes of daughter Catherine Sturdza who became a nun and donated the property to become a nunnery, which it finally became in 1990.

See also
 Sturdza Family

Notes

External links
 Official Sturdza Palace at Miclauseni Website

 
Buildings and structures in Iași County
Historic monuments in Iași County
Palaces in Romania
Tourist attractions in Iași County
History of Moldavia (1504–1711)
Medieval Wallachia
Medieval Moldavia